Hypsithocus is a genus of true bugs belonging to the family Pentatomidae.

The species of this genus are found in New Zealand.

Species:

Hypsithocus hudsonae
Hypsithocus spec

References

Pentatomidae